Muntra is a family of unmanned armored vehicle developed by India's Defence Research and Development Organisation. The name stands for "Mission Unmanned Tracked"

Design

Muntra is a family modified  Soviet BMP-2 armored personnel carrier intended to be used for Unmanned missions. Current variants are unarmed. Three variants exist: Muntra-S for surveillance, Muntra-M for mine clearing, and Muntra-N operating in nuclear or chemical contaminated zones. It has autonomous navigation through GPS waypoints with obstacle detection and avoidance.

Variants

Muntra-B

It is the command post for the MUNTRA series of vehicles. It has a 2 man crew to command the MUNTRA series of vehicles via datalink.

MUNTRA-S

MUNTRA-S is tele-operated from MUNTRA-B via a datalink or through pre set waypoints. It has a maximum detection range of 15 Kilometres.

MUNTRA-M

The Muntra-M is equipped with ground Penetrating Radar (GPR) and Vapour Detection System (VDS) to detect landmines and IED'S and marks the area.

MUNTRA-N

The MUNTRA-N is intended to operate in Nuclear and biological affected area to carry out survey and recon of the affected area.It is capable of detecting nuclear radiations ,chemical warfare agents ,biological agents like viruses, Bacteria and spores etc. and can collect samples from the affected area.

See also 
 DRDO Daksh
 Unmanned ground vehicle
 DRDO Rustom
 HAL CATS Warrior
 HAL Combat Air Teaming System

References

Unmanned ground combat vehicles
Military vehicles of India